Paul Grigoriu (6 March 1945 – 2 April 2015) was a Romanian journalist, writer and program director at Radio România.

Biography 
Grigoriu was born in Bacău on 6 March 1945. He was a graduate of the University of Bucharest and since 1969 he has worked at the Romanian Radio. After 1990 he became producer of the show "Matinal" on Radio Romania.

Born on March 6, 1945, in Bacău, Paul Grigoriu is a graduate of the Faculty of Romance, Classical and Oriental Languages - University of Bucharest (French-Spanish section), and since 1969 he has worked at the Romanian Broadcasting, Foreign Writing (REPS), French section . After 1990, he became the director of the show "Matinal" on Radio România Actualități.

He was the editor-in-chief of Program III (Radio Romania Youth) and - since 1992 - deputy general director of the Romanian Broadcasting. Between October 1994 and September 1995 he was the interim general manager of the Romanian Broadcasting Company. Deputy Director General (Head of National Channels) until 2002, when he resigned. He was a show producer, an exceptional professional and moderator of the daily program "Academic Quarter".

Paul Grigoriu's journalistic career is marked by the summer performances of Radio Vacanța - until 1989 - and by radio programs such as "Noapte alb blue" or "k-drane" that brought him the popular show "Matinal", whose initiator was after 1990. Radiogenia and his journalistic talent made this show the spearhead of the National Radio audience, at a time when competition with commercial stations was intensifying from Foremost personality of the Romanian Radio (for many even a living emblem of it), "Mr. Radio" marked with his inspired performance the post-December section of the history of Romanian radio.

He also had an intense literary activity, starting with poetry in 1967, in the magazine Amphitheater. His first book was Anatomy of a Street (1992), followed by French Summer (A Romantic in Paris) (1998), The Legacy of the Tinsmith (2000), Radio.grafii. 1969-1989 (2000), Kangaroos at All (Comando at Antipozi) (2001), Beyond the Great Wall (2008), Two for a Childhood (2015), The Wrinkles and Cuts of History (2015). In 2013 Paul Grigoriu also launched volume G from Gugiumeni. False monograph, Casa Radio Publishing House.

He received two important distinctions from the Romanian Presidency: the Order of Cultural Merit and the National Order "Faithful Service".

He was editor of the Programme III on Radio Romania Youth.

Grigoriu died on 2 April 2015 in Buciumeni (Dâmbovița County).

References 

1945 births
2015 deaths
Romanian journalists
Romanian writers
Romanian radio people
People from Bacău